Gerrit van Gelderen (1926-1994) was a Dutch-born naturalist, wildlife broadcaster, film-maker, illustrator and cartoonist, who lived and worked in Ireland for a large part of his life. He is famous for his television work  on Amuigh Faoin Spéir with Éamon de Buitléar. and his series "To the Waters and the Wild" that ran from 1974 - 1994.

Van Gelderen was born 26 August 1926 in Rotterdam and was educated at the Royal Academy of Art, The Hague. He moved to Dublin, Ireland, in 1955 to work in advertising. Some of his illustrations featured in the Farmers Journal.
In the 1960s he started working with de Buitléar producing programmes for television.

Van Gelderen was a close friend of fellow Dutch graphic designer and artist Jan de Fouw who also moved to Ireland. Their families lived together in Islandbridge, before moving to adjoining houses in Glencullen, in the Dublin mountains

Van Gelderen and De Fouw were among a group of Dutch artists who moved to Ireland in the 1950s, including Guus Melai, Bert van Embden, Willem van Velzen, Piet Sluis and Cor Klaasen (Text books covers).

Gerrit died 28 February 1994 at his home in Sandyford following a lung operation. He was survived by his wife Lies van Gelderen and four children Merlin, Aoife, Finn and Oisín.

Work
 The Burren (1984) Director, Writer and Cinematographer
  Amuigh Faoin Spéir (Out Under the Sky)  with Éamon de Buitléar, drawings by Gerrit van Gelderen
 An tOchtapas agus rainn eile (Baile Atha Cliath: Clódhanna Teo 1977), illustrations by Gerrit van Gelderen.
 To the Waters and the Wild, Gerrit van Gelderen (1974)
To the Waters and the Wild/Adventures of a Wildlife Film Maker by Gerrit van Gelderen, (1986).
Doings by Gerrit van Gelderen, (1975)

References
Patrick Long, "van Gelderen, Gerrit", 'Dictionary of Irish Biography', (Eds.) James Mcguire, James Quinn, Cambridge University Press, 2009, 

1926 births
1994 deaths
Dutch cartoonists
Dutch illustrators
Van Gelderen
Van Gelderen
Royal Academy of Art, The Hague alumni
Artists from Rotterdam
Dutch emigrants to Ireland